The Ministry of Public Works was a department of the Albanian government in the early beginnings of the newly formed Albanian State. Established as an institution since the first provisional government of Ismail Qemali, on December 4, 1912, the ministry would play an important role in later governments and continued to function even after the war until it was broken up into several ministries, starting with the Hoxha III Cabinet. Its status would briefly reemerge in 1996 during the Meksi II Government and lasting until 2002.
The ministry was tasked with supervising construction projects, the maintenance of roads, bridges, state buildings and general utilities infrastructure.

Officeholders (1912–1953)

Notes

References

Public Works
Albania